Jay Karl Stevens is a poet, historian, and journalist with a special interest in states of consciousness. He is the author of Storming Heaven: LSD and the American Dream, and co-author of Drumming at the Edge of Magic with Grateful Dead percussionist Mickey Hart and ethnomusicologist Fredric Lieberman. He is the founder of Applied Orphics, a revolutionary DIY for the marketing and distribution of digital media, and of Rap Lab, a program bringing at-risk teenagers and professional musicians and poets together.

Books
 Storming Heaven: LSD and the American Dream (Grove Press 1998) 
 Drumming at the Edge of Magic (with Mickey Hart & Fredric Lieberman) (1990 Harper San Francisco) 
 Planet Drum: A Celebration of Percussion and Rhythm (with Mickey Hart & Fredric Lieberman) (1998 Harper San Francisco)

Discography
 Dance House by Jay Stevens and Derek Young (2012) 
 Orphic Revival by Jay Karl Stevens and The Raven (2013)

Notes

References
 The Sixties edited by Peter Stine, Jay Stevens contributor. Wayne State University Press (January 1, 1996) , 
 Acid Christ: Ken Kesey, LSD, and the Politics of Ecstasy by Mark Christensen. Schaffner Press (November 1, 2011) , 
 Sex, Death, and God in L.A. edited by David Reid. University of California Press (1992) (Reissued 2013 by Random House)
 Drunk the Night Before: An Anatomy of Intoxication by Marty Roth. University of Minnesota Press (2005)
 The Sex Revolts: Gender, Rebellion, and Rock 'n' Roll by Simon Reynolds. Harvard University Press (1996)
 San Francisco: A Cultural and Literary History by Mick Sinclair. Interlink Books (2004)
 Acid Dreams: The Complete Social History of LSD : the CIA, the Sixties, and Beyond by Martin A. Lee and Bruce Shlain. Grove Press (1992)

External links
 Jay Stevens' website
 New scientist
 Video about Rap Lab and audio clip in Vermont Life

Living people
20th-century American novelists
21st-century American historians
21st-century American male writers
American male journalists
American male novelists
American psychedelic drug advocates
20th-century American male writers
Year of birth missing (living people)
American male non-fiction writers